"Favor" is a song by American recording artist Lonny Bereal, featuring guest vocals from American singer Kelly Rowland. Originally recorded by Chris Brown, Lonny Bereal, Teyana Taylor. It was released by Notifi Music Group as the lead single from his upcoming debut album The Love Train on May 17, 2011, and has since debuted at number 85 on the US Billboard Hot R&B/Hip-Hop Songs chart.

Music video
A music video to accompany the release of "Favor" was first released onto YouTube on 4 July 2011 at a total length of four minutes and five seconds. It was directed by Juwan Lee and produced by Adiclere Hunter.

Track listing

Charts

Release history

References

2011 singles
Kelly Rowland songs
Songs written by Lonny Bereal
2011 songs
Songs written by Chris Brown
Songs written by Teyana Taylor
Songs written by Kevin McCall